Roger Mooking is a Trinidadian-Canadian chef, musician, and television host. Mooking is the host of the television series Man Fire Food (2012 to present). He is also the host and co-creator of Everyday Exotic. Both programs aired on the Cooking Channel and Food Network Canada. He also appears on Heat Seekers with Aarón Sanchez on Food Network. Mooking has had many appearances on shows such as Today, Good Morning America, The Marilyn Denis Show, Iron Chef America, Top Chef Canada, and Chopped Canada.

Early life
Mooking was born in Trinidad and Tobago into an extended family made up of food and beverage business providers. He moved to Canada at the age of five, and grew up in Edmonton, Alberta, where his parents were in the restaurant business. He has both Caribbean and Chinese ancestry. Mooking was introduced to European flavours by his mother, who prepared dishes from recipes passed on by her Ukrainian neighbours.

Career

Musical career
Under the stage name MC Mystic, Mooking spent the early 1990s as a member of the Edmonton-based hip hop band The Maximum Definitive, who received a Juno Award nomination in 1993 for their single "Jungle Man". The band then moved to Toronto to continue their musical careers, but broke up due to creative differences before they could actually complete recording a full album, and Mooking went on to join the soul/R&B trio Bass Is Base.

Bass Is Base consisted of Chin Injeti on bass, Ivana Santilli on keyboards, and MC Mystic (Roger Mooking) on percussion. All three members contributed vocals, Injeti and Santilli as singers and Mystic as a rapper. In addition to the early single "Funk-mobile", which garnered the band a deal with A&M Records, their debut album, First Impressions for the Bottom Jigglers, won a Juno Award in the Best R&B/Soul Recording category in 1995.  A year later, the second consequential album, Memories of the Soul Shack Survivors, gave the band its first Top 20 hit, “I Cry.”

Mooking has since released two solo albums, Soul Food in 2008 and Feedback in 2013.

Chef

Mooking studied culinary arts at George Brown College, and still continues to operate as the chair of the professional advisory committee. Mooking worked at Toronto's Royal York Hotel before co-owning and consulting on many food and beverage operations in Ontario.

During his years as a restaurateur, Mooking was the executive chef and co-owner of Kultura Social Dining and Nyood Restaurant.

Currently he is the executive chef at Twist by Roger Mooking, located in Terminal 1 at Toronto Pearson International Airport.

Television appearances
Mooking is the host of several television shows, including Heat Seekers and Man Fire Food. He is also the co-creator and host of Everyday Exotic, a television show in which he features spices and other flavourful ingredients from around the globe and shows viewers how to use them in everyday cooking. As the host of Man Fire Food on Cooking Channel, Mooking travels around the U.S. exploring different ways to cook with fire and smoke, from small campfires to creative custom-made grills and smokers. Man Fire Food is in its eighth season. Mooking served as a recurring judge on Food Network's Chopped Canada. He served as a judge on two episodes of season 10 Guy's Grocery Games.

Mooking has also been the subject of an hour-long biography titled Chefography for Cooking Channel.

Mooking has appeared on The Today Show, Good Morning America, Iron Chef America, Top Chef Canada, The Marilyn Denis Show, Wendy Williams, Martha Stewart Radio, Unique Eats, and Steven and Chris. Mooking has also made regular appearances at various food and wine festivals, including New York Food and Wine Festival, South Beach Food and Wine Festival, Gourmet Escape and The Essence Music Festival.

He is slated to appear in the 2021 edition of Canada Reads, advocating for Francesca Ekwuyasi's novel Butter Honey Pig Bread.

Author
Mooking’s cookbook, "Everyday Exotic: The Cookbook", was published 2011, and won a Gourmand World Cookbook award. The book explains how to add unconventional ingredients to traditional dishes to experience the flavors developed by cultures from Asia to the Middle East, Europe, the Caribbean, and the Americas.

Filmography

Charitable work
In 2011, Mooking partnered up with World Vision Canada and made a trip to Cambodia to exchange information and ideas about child nutrition, and to bring awareness to the issues of healthy food and clean water for families in all countries.

In fall 2012, Mooking traveled to Bangladesh to visit nutrition-related programming run by Save the Children and to meet with community groups, medical clinics, and local families and explore ways to create sustainable health and nutrition programs so that successful concepts can be applied worldwide. He has continued to work with Save The Children and their programming and has since traveled to Peru as well as worked with the organization locally.

Mooking is also committed to Toronto-based charity Second Harvest, co-hosting its annual charity Toronto Taste, for providing rescued food to families in need.

Personal life
Mooking is married and has four daughters. He has claimed to have "never [cooked] the same thing twice."

References

External links
Official website
"Toronto Taste"

Living people
20th-century Black Canadian male singers
20th-century Canadian rappers
21st-century Black Canadian male singers
21st-century Canadian rappers
Black Canadian broadcasters
Canadian male chefs
Canadian male rappers
Canadian male singers
Canadian people of Caribbean descent
Canadian people of Chinese descent
Canadian philanthropists
Canadian rhythm and blues musicians
Canadian television chefs
Canadian television hosts
George Brown College alumni
Musicians from Edmonton
Trinidad and Tobago emigrants to Canada
Year of birth missing (living people)